Rankuh (also Romanized as Rānkūh) is a city & capital of Rankuh District, in Amlash County, Gilan Province, Iran.  At the 2006 census, its population was 956, in 266 families.

References

Populated places in Amlash County

Cities in Gilan Province